Ashti dam, is an earthfill dam on Ashti River near Mohol, Solapur district in state of Maharashtra in India.

Specifications

Purpose
 Irrigation

See also
 Dams in Maharashtra
 List of reservoirs and dams in India

References

Dams in Solapur district
Dams completed in 1883
1883 establishments in India